Sultan's cuckoo-dove (Macropygia doreya) is a dove in the genus Macropygia found in the northern Moluccas, Sulawesi to New Guinea and the western Papuan islands. It was one of three new species defined when the slender-billed cuckoo-dove was split up in 2016.

Description
The males tend to have a slight rose/green colouration on their nape and neck. Many subspecies have whitish underparts, fine dark barring below and/or a whitish cap.

The call of this dove is a very loud "whoop-a whoop" with some differences depending on the subspecies involved.

Sultan's cuckoo-dove inhabits rainforest, woodland, scrubland and rainforest regrowth areas.

The doves can often be seen in pairs or groups. Its diet consists of berries from both native plants and introduced weed species. They can be nomadic, depending on the supplies of food. They tend to fly short distances and low to the ground with great strength.

Breeding occurs in spring and summer. The nest is a flat platform of sticks and vines, either in a fork of a tree or on top of a low tree. One, creamy white, egg is laid.

Subspecies
 M. d. doreya Bonaparte, 1854 -  western New Guinea and western Papuan islands
 M. d. balim Rand, 1941 -  Balim Valley, north central New Guinea
 M. d. albiceps Bonaparte, 1856 -  northern Moluccas 
 M. d. atrata Ripley, 1941 - Togian Island 
 M. d. sanghirensis Salvadori, 1878 - Sangihe Islands and Talaud Islands
 M. d. albicapilla Bonaparte, 1854 - Sulawesi
 M. d. sedecima Neumann, 1939 - Sula Islands

References

Further reading

Birds of Indonesia
Macropygia
Birds described in 1854
Taxa named by Charles Lucien Bonaparte